The Melanesia Cup 1994 was the fifth Melanesia-wide tournament ever held. It took place in Solomon Islands and five teams participated: Fiji, Solomon Islands, New Caledonia, Papua New Guinea and Vanuatu and server for the first time as Oceania Nations Cup qualifyer.

The teams played each other according to a round-robin format with Solomon Islands winning the tournament for the second time and qualifying to the Oceania Nations Cup 1996.

Results

The Solomon Islands qualified for Oceania Nations Cup 1996.

References

Melanesia Cup
1993–94 in OFC football
1994
1994 in Solomon Islands sport
1996 OFC Nations Cup
July 1994 sports events in Oceania